Government Pilot Higher Secondary School is a school located in Larkana, Pakistan.

History
The school was built in 1926 by British in what was then British India.

The British-era E-shaped building denotes England that still stands high without any cracks and scars. It comprises 81 rooms being used as classrooms, offices, labs, drawing hall, auditorium as well as a recently established library.

After Pakistan came into being, the school shifted its affiliation to the University of Sindh.

There were around 550 students enrolled in the school when it began imparting education and with the passage of time the number constantly increased.

It was in 1964 that under a president directive it was selected as President's Project and renamed as Govt Pilot Secondary School with the induction of four workshops (metal, wood, electrical, and typing) aimed at imparting technical education and skills to students.

In 1994, then prime minister Benazir Bhutto upgraded it under the Prime Minister's Programme and its name was changed again to Govt Pilot Higher Secondary School. Pre-engineering and pre-medical disciplines were introduced and the post of headmaster was upgraded to the status of principal.

Alumni
 Ashraf Abbasi, the first woman deputy speaker of the National Assembly
 Ahmed Ali Sheikh, Chief Justice of the Sindh High Court

References 

Larkana District
Schools in Sindh
1926 establishments in British India